The fourth series of British television sitcom Absolutely Fabulous premiered on BBC One on 31 August 2001 and concluded on 5 October 2001, consisting of six episodes. Originally, Absolutely Fabulous was to end with the third series, then two-part special "The Last Shout" was created to serve as an official finale to the series. However, in 2000, Jennifer Saunders created and wrote a television pilot for a proposed new series, Mirrorball, in which she intended to reunite the cast of Absolutely Fabulous in new roles and a different plot. Saunders, along with Joanna Lumley, Julia Sawalha, Jane Horrocks and June Whitfield, returned for the pilot, but the series was never commissioned. Nevertheless, Mirrorball inspired Saunders to revive Absolutely Fabulous and a fourth series was produced. A Christmas special, "Gay" (titled "Absolutely Fabulous in New York" in the United States), was produced following the fourth series and was broadcast in 2002.

Cast and characters

Main
 Jennifer Saunders as Edina Monsoon
 Joanna Lumley as Patsy Stone 
 Julia Sawalha as Saffron Monsoon 
 Jane Horrocks as Bubble / Katy Grin
 June Whitfield as Mother

Recurring

 Twiggy as herself
 Antony Cotton as Damon
 Naoko Mori as Sarah
 Tilly Blackwood as Lady Candida de Denison-Bender
 Helen Lederer as Catriona
 Harriet Thorpe as Fleur
 Mo Gaffney as Bo
 Christopher Ryan as Marshall
 Lady Victoria Hervey as herself

Guest

 Bob Barrett as Labour Party man
 Stephen Gately as himself
 Michael Greco as himself
 Judy Finnigan as herself
 Richard Madeley as himself
 Dora Bryan as Dolly
 Tim Wylton as Brice
 Crispin Bonham-Carter as Jago Balfour
 Dave Gorman as Rimmer
 Erin O'Connor as herself
 Annegret Tree as herself
 Daphne Selfe as herself
 Pascal Liger as sleazy man
 Sacha Distel as himself
 Christian Lacroix as himself
 Robin Cope as fitness instructor
 Julian Rhind-Tutt as Taylor
 Andrea Gillie as Patsy's secretary
 Jessica Willcocks as Minge
 Marianne Faithfull as God
 Anita Pallenberg as Devil
 Lill Roughley as Jude
 Miles Western as Martin
 Emma Pierson as Kasha
 Josh Neale as Josh
 Melanie Jessop as police woman
 Ashely Clish as Saffron as child
 Christopher Malcolm as Justin
 Celia Imrie as Claudia Bing
 Jeillo Edwards as herself
 Joanna Bowen as JoBo
 Ruby Wax as Beth
 Leigh Lawson as himself
 Dale Winton as himself

"Gay" guest cast

 Christopher Ryan as Marshall
 Mo Gaffney as Bo
 Harriet Thorpe as Fleur
 Helen Lederer as Catriona
 Josh Hamilton as Serge
 Danny Burstein as Martin
 Nathan Lee Graham as assistant at "GUFF"
 Whoopi Goldberg as Goldie
 Debbie Harry as herself
 Graham Norton as himself
 Jared Gold as himself
 Rufus Wainwright as himself
 Alan Hobson as check-in agent (uncredited)
 Jesse Tyler Ferguson as party guest (uncredited)

Episodes

Home media
VHS (United States)
 "Series 4: Part 1" – 5 February 2002
 "Series 4: Part 2" – 5 February 2002

VHS (United Kingdom)
 "Series 4" – 19 November 2001
 As part of the "Series 1-4" (8-VHS set) – 25 November 2002

DVD (Region 1)
 "Series 4" (2-disc set) – 5 February 2002
 "Complete Series 4" re-release (2-disc set) – 13 September 2005
 As part of "Absolutely Fabulous: Absolutely Everything" (9-disc set) – 27 May 2008
 As Part of the "Absolutely Fabulous: Absolutely All of It!" (10-disc set) - 5 November 2013

DVD (Region 2)
 "Series 4" (2-disc set) – 8 April 2002
 As part of "Series 1–4" (5-disc set) – 25 November 2002
 As part of "Absolutely Fabulous: Absolutely Everything" (10-disc set) – 15 November 2010
 As part of "Absolutely Fabulous: Absolutely Everything - The Definitive Edition" (11-disc set) – 17 March 2014

DVD (Region 4)
 "Series 4" (2-disc set) – 8 August 2002
 As part of "Absolutely Fabulous: Absolutely Everything"  (9-disc set) – 20 April 2006
 As part of "Absolutely Fabulous: Complete Collection" (10-disc set) – 5 April 2011
 As Part of the "Absolutely Everything: Definitive Edition" (11-disc set) – 30 April 2014

'Gay' special
 United States
 DVD as part of "Absolutely Fabulous: Absolutely Special" – 30 September 2003 (includes 'The Last Shout')
 DVD as part of "Absolutely Fabulous: Absolutely Special" re-release – 13 September 2005 (includes 'The Last Shout')
 DVD as part of "Absolutely Fabulous: Absolutely Everything – 27 May 2008
 DVD as part of "Absolutely Fabulous: Absolutely All of It! – 5 November 2013
 United Kingdom
 DVD - 29 September 2003
 DVD as part of "Absolutely Fabulous: Absolutely Everything" – 15 November 2010
 DVD as part of "Absolutely Fabulous: Absolutely Everything - The Definitive Edition" – 17 March 2014
 Australia
 DVD as part of "Series 5" – 8 April 2004
 DVD as part of "Absolutely Fabulous: Absolutely Everything" – 20 April 2006
 DVD as part of "Absolutely Fabulous: Complete Collection" – 5 April 2011
 DVD as part of "Absolutely Everything: Definitive Edition" – 30 April 2014

Further reading

See also
 Mirrorball – 2000 television pilot

References

External links
 Absolutely Fabulous series 4 – list of episodes on IMDb

2001 British television seasons
Series 4